Live Science is a science news website. It publishes stories in a wide variety of topics such as Space, Animals, Health, Archaeology, Human behavior and Planet Earth. It also has a Forum section for open discussions and a Reference section with links to other sites. Their mission is "make the wonders of science and the world around us relevant, useful and interesting to everyone by informing and entertaining our readers ".

History 

Live Science was originally launched in 2004, but was subsequently shut down and re-launched in 2007. It was acquired by TechMediaNetwork, later called Purch,  in 2009.  Purch consumer brands (including Live Science) were acquired by Future in 2018.

Reception 

Live Science has been rated GREEN for its credibility and trustworthiness by NewsGuard, a global service that rates news sources for their journalistic standards. 

Live Science is a member of the Independent Press Standards Organisation which regulates the UK's magazine and newspaper industry.

Awards 

2007: Winner, Award for Specialty Site Journalism (large organization) from the Online Journalism Awards.
 
2008, 2010: Honoree, Websites and Mobile Sites, Science from the Webby Awards.
 
2021: Listed as one of the top 10 science websites from the website "Make Use Of".

References

External links
 
 
 
 

2004 establishments in the United States
American science websites
Magazines established in 2004
Science and technology magazines published in the United States